Deus Ex is a 2000 action role-playing game developed by Ion Storm and published by Eidos Interactive. Set in a cyberpunk-themed dystopian world in the year 2052, the game follows JC Denton, an agent of the fictional agency United Nations Anti-Terrorist Coalition (UNATCO), who is given superhuman abilities by nanotechnology, as he sets out to combat hostile forces in a world ravaged by inequality and a deadly plague. His missions entangle him in a conspiracy that brings him into conflict with the Triads, Majestic 12, and the Illuminati.

Deus Exs gameplay combines elements of the first-person shooter with stealth elements, adventure, and role-playing genres, allowing for its tasks and missions to be completed in a variety of ways, which in turn lead to differing outcomes. Presented from the first-person perspective, the player can customize Denton's various abilities such as weapon skills or lockpicking, increasing his effectiveness in these areas; this opens up different avenues of exploration and methods of interacting with or manipulating other characters. The player can complete side missions away from the primary storyline by moving freely around the available areas, which can reward the player with experience points to upgrade abilities and alternative ways to tackle main missions. Powered by the Unreal Engine, the game was released for Microsoft Windows in June 2000, with a Mac OS port following the next month. A modified version of the game was released for the PlayStation 2 in 2002 as Deus Ex: The Conspiracy. In the years following its release, Deus Ex has received additional improvements and content from its fan community.

The game received critical acclaim, including being named "Best PC Game of All Time" in PC Gamers "Top 100 PC Games" in 2011 and a poll carried out by the UK gaming magazine PC Zone. Deus Ex was praised for ambitious plot, freedom of immersive gameplay, world-building, diversity of character customization and choice matters, but its graphics and voice acting polarized critics. It received several Game of the Year awards, drawing praise for its pioneering designs in player choice and multiple narrative paths. Deus Ex is regarded as one of the best video games of all time. It has sold more than 1 million copies, as of April 23, 2009. The game led to a series, which includes the sequel Deus Ex: Invisible War (2003), and three prequels: Deus Ex: Human Revolution (2011), Deus Ex: The Fall (2013), and Deus Ex: Mankind Divided (2016).

Gameplay 
Deus Ex incorporates elements from four video game genres: role-playing, first-person shooter, adventure, and "immersive simulation", the last of which being a game where "nothing reminds you that you're just playing a game." For example, the game uses a first-person camera during gameplay and includes exploration and character interaction as primary features.

The player assumes the role of JC Denton, a nanotech-augmented operative of the United Nations Anti-Terrorist Coalition (UNATCO). This nanotechnology is a central gameplay mechanism and allows players to perform superhuman feats.

Role-playing elements 
As the player accomplishes objectives, the player character is rewarded with "skill points". Skill points are used to enhance a character's abilities in eleven different areas, and were designed to provide players with a way to customize their characters; a player might create a combat-focused character by increasing proficiency with pistols or rifles, while a more furtive character can be created by focusing on lock picking and computer hacking abilities. There are four different levels of proficiency in each skill, with the skill point cost increasing for each successive level.

Weapons may be customized through "weapon modifications", which can be found or purchased throughout the game. The player might add scopes, silencers, or laser sights; increase the weapon's range, accuracy, or magazine size; or decrease its recoil and reload time; as appropriate to the weapon type.

Players are further encouraged to customize their characters through nano-augmentations—cybernetic devices that grant characters superhuman powers. While the game contains eighteen different nano-augmentations, the player can install a maximum of nine, as each must be used on a certain part of the body: one in the arms, legs, eyes, and head; two underneath the skin; and three in the torso. This forces the player to choose carefully between the benefits offered by each augmentation. For example, the arm augmentation requires the player to decide between boosting their character's skill in hand-to-hand combat or his ability to lift heavy objects.

Interaction with non-player characters (NPCs) was a significant design focus. When the player interacts with a non-player character, the game will enter a cutscene-like conversation mode where the player advances the conversation by selecting from a list of dialogue options. The player's choices often have a substantial effect on both gameplay and plot, as non-player characters will react in different ways depending on the selected answer (e.g., rudeness makes them less likely to assist the player).

Combat elements 
Deus Ex features combat similar to first-person shooters, with real-time action, a first-person perspective, and reflex-based gameplay. As the player will often encounter enemies in groups, combat often tends toward a tactical approach, including the use of cover, strafing, and "hit-and-run". A USA Today reviewer found, "At the easiest difficulty setting, your character is puréed again and again by an onslaught of human and robotic terrorists until you learn the value of stealth." However, through the game's role-playing systems, it is possible to develop a character's skills and augmentations to create a tank-like combat specialist with the ability to deal and absorb large amounts of damage. Non-player characters will praise or criticize the main character depending on the use of force, incorporating a moral element into the gameplay.

Deus Ex features a head-up display crosshair, whose size dynamically shows where shots will fall based on movement, aim, and the weapon in use; the reticle expands while the player is moving or shifting their aim, and slowly shrinks to its original size while at rest. How quickly the reticle shrinks depends on the character's proficiency with the equipped weapon, the number of accuracy modifications added to the weapon, and the level of the "Targeting" nano-augmentation.

Deus Ex features twenty-four weapons, ranging from crowbars, electroshock weapons, and riot baton, to laser-guided anti-tank rockets and assault rifles; both lethal and non-lethal weapons are available. The player can also make use of several weapons of opportunity, such as fire extinguishers.

Player choice 

Gameplay in Deus Ex emphasizes player choice. Objectives can be completed in numerous ways, including stealth, sniping, heavy frontal assault, dialogue, or engineering and computer hacking. This level of freedom requires that levels, characters, and puzzles be designed with significant redundancy, as a single play-through of the game will miss large sections of dialogue, areas, and other content. In some missions, the player is encouraged to avoid using deadly force, and specific aspects of the story may change depending on how violent or non-violent the player chooses to be. The game is also unusual in that two of its boss villains can be killed off early in the game, or left alive to be defeated later, and this too affects how other characters interact with the player.

Because of its design focus on player choice, Deus Ex has been compared with System Shock, a game that inspired its design. Together, these factors give the game a high degree of replayability, as the player will have vastly different experiences, depending on which methods they use to accomplish objectives.

Multiplayer 
Deus Ex was designed as a single-player game, and the initial releases of the Windows and Macintosh versions of the game did not include multiplayer functionality. Support for multiplayer modes was later incorporated through patches. The component consists of three game modes: deathmatch, basic team deathmatch, and advanced team deathmatch. Five maps, based on levels from the single-player portion of the game, were included with the original multiplayer patch, but many user-created maps exist, while also many features of the single-player game missing in multiplayer have been re-introduced by various user RPG modifications. The PlayStation 2 release of Deus Ex does not offer a multiplayer mode. In April 2014 it was announced that GameSpy would cease their masterserver services, also affecting Deus Ex. A community-made patch for the multiplayer mode has been created as a response to this.

Synopsis

Setting and characters 
Deus Ex takes place in 2052, in an alternate history where real-world conspiracy theories are true. These include speculations regarding black helicopters, vaccinations, and FEMA, as well as Area 51, the ECHELON network, Men in Black, chupacabras (in the form of "greasels"), and grey aliens. Mysterious groups such as Majestic 12, the Illuminati, the Knights Templar, the Bilderberg Group, and the Trilateral Commission also either play a central part in the plot or are alluded to during the course of the game.

The plot of Deus Ex depicts a society on a slow spiral into chaos. There is a massive division between the rich and the poor, not only socially, but in some cities physically. A lethal pandemic, known as the "Gray Death", ravages the world's population, especially within the United States, and has no cure. A synthetic vaccine, "Ambrosia", manufactured by the company VersaLife, nullifies the effects of the virus but is in critically short supply. Because of its scarcity, Ambrosia is available only to those deemed "vital to the social order", and finds its way primarily to government officials, military personnel, the rich and influential, scientists, and the intellectual elite. With no hope for the common people of the world, riots occur worldwide, and some terrorist organizations have formed with the professed intent of assisting the downtrodden, among them the National Secessionist Forces (NSF) of the U.S. and a French group known as Silhouette.

To combat these threats to the world order, the United Nations has expanded its influence around the globe to form the United Nations Anti-Terrorist Coalition (UNATCO). It is headquartered near New York City in a bunker beneath Liberty Island, placed there after a terrorist strike on the Statue of Liberty.

The main character of Deus Ex is UNATCO agent JC Denton (voiced by Jay Franke), one of the first in a new line of agents physically altered with advanced nanotechnology to gain superhuman abilities, alongside his brother Paul (also voiced by Jay Franke), who joined UNATCO to avenge his parents' deaths at the hands of Majestic 12. His UNATCO colleagues include the mechanically-augmented and ruthlessly efficient field agents Gunther Hermann and Anna Navarre; Quartermaster General Sam Carter, and the bureaucratic UNATCO chief Joseph Manderley. UNATCO communications tech Alex Jacobson's character model and name are based on Warren Spector's nephew, Alec Jacobson.

JC's missions bring him into contact with various characters, including NSF leader Juan Lebedev, hacker and scientist Tracer Tong, nano-tech expert Gary Savage, Nicolette DuClare (daughter of an Illuminati member), former Illuminati leader Morgan Everett, the Artificial Intelligences (AI) Daedalus and Icarus, and Bob Page, owner of VersaLife and leader of Majestic 12, a clandestine organization that has usurped the infrastructure of the Illuminati, allowing him to control the world for his own ends.

Plot 
After completing his training, UNATCO agent JC Denton takes several missions given by Director Joseph Manderley to track down members of the National Secessionist Forces (NSF) and their stolen shipments of the Ambrosia vaccine, the treatment for the Gray Death virus. Through these missions, JC is reunited with his brother, Paul, who is also nano-augmented. JC tracks the Ambrosia shipment to a private terminal at LaGuardia Airport. Paul meets JC outside the plane and explains that he has defected from UNATCO and is working with the NSF after learning that the Gray Death is a human-made virus, with UNATCO using its power to make sure only the elite receive the vaccine.

JC returns to UNATCO headquarters and is told by Manderley that both he and Paul have been outfitted with a 24-hour kill switch and that Paul's has been activated due to his betrayal. Manderley orders JC to fly to Hong Kong to eliminate Tracer Tong, a hacker whom Paul has contact with, and who can disable the kill switches. Instead, JC returns to Paul's apartment to find Paul hiding inside. Paul further explains his defection and encourages JC to also defect by sending out a distress call to alert the NSF's allies. Upon doing so, JC becomes a wanted man by UNATCO, and his kill switch is activated by Federal Emergency Management Agency (FEMA) Director Walton Simons. JC is unable to escape UNATCO forces, and both he and Paul (provided he survived the raid on the apartment) are taken to a secret prison below UNATCO headquarters. An entity named "Daedalus" contacts JC and informs him that the prison is part of Majestic 12, and arranges for him and Paul to escape. The two flee to Hong Kong to meet with Tong, who deactivates their kill switches. Tong requests that JC infiltrate the VersaLife building. Doing so, JC discovers that the corporation is the source for the Gray Death, and he can steal the plans for the virus and destroy the universal constructor (UC) that produces it.

Analysis of the virus shows that its structure was designed by the Illuminati, prompting Tong to send JC to Paris to obtain their help fighting Majestic 12. JC meets with Illuminati leader Morgan Everett and learns that the technology behind the Gray Death was intended to be used for augmentation, but Majestic 12, led by trillionaire businessman and former Illuminatus Bob Page, stole and repurposed it. Everett recognizes that without VersaLife's UC, Majestic 12 can no longer create the virus, and will likely target Vandenberg Air Force Base, where X-51, a group of former Area 51 scientists, have built another one. After aiding the base personnel in repelling a Majestic 12 attack, JC meets X-51 leader Gary Savage, who reveals that Daedalus is an artificial intelligence (AI) borne out of the ECHELON program.

Everett attempts to gain control over Majestic 12's communications network by releasing Daedalus onto the U.S. military networks, but Page counters by releasing his own AI, Icarus. Icarus merges with Daedalus to form a new AI, Helios, which can control all global communications. Savage enlists JC's help in procuring schematics for reconstructing components for the UC that were damaged during Majestic 12's raid of Vandenberg. JC finds the schematics and transmits them to Savage. Page intercepts the transmission and targets a nuclear missile at Vandenberg to ensure that Area 51, now Majestic 12's headquarters, will be the only location in the world with an operational UC. However, JC can reprogram the missile to strike Area 51.

JC travels to Area 51 to confront Page. Page reveals that he seeks to merge with Helios and gain full control over nanotechnology. JC is contacted by Tong, Everett, and the Helios AI simultaneously. All three factions ask for his help in defeating Page while furthering their own objectives. Tong seeks to plunge the world into a Dark Age by destroying the global communications hub and preventing anyone from taking control of the world. Everett offers Denton the chance to return the Illuminati to power by killing Page and using the Area 51 technology to rule the world with an invisible hand. Helios wishes to merge with Denton and rule the world as a benevolent dictator with infinite knowledge and reason. The player's decision determines the future and brings the game to a close.

Development 

After Looking Glass Technologies and Origin Systems released Ultima Underworld II: Labyrinth of Worlds in January 1993, producer Warren Spector began to plan Troubleshooter, the game that would become Deus Ex. In his 1994 proposal, he described the concept as "Underworld-style first-person action" in a real-world setting with "big-budget, nonstop action".  After Spector and his team were laid off from Looking Glass, John Romero of Ion Storm offered him the chance to make his "dream game" without any restrictions.

Preproduction for Deus Ex began around August 1997 and lasted roughly six months. The project's budget was $5 million to $7 million. The game's working title was Shooter: Majestic Revelations, and it was scheduled for release on Christmas 1998. The team developed the setting before the game mechanics. Noticing his wife's fascination with The X-Files, Spector connected the "real world, millennial weirdness, [and] conspiracy" topics on his mind and decided to make a game about them that would appeal to a broad audience. The Shooter design document cast the player as an augmented agent working against an elite cabal in the "dangerous and chaotic" 2050s. It cited Half-Life, Fallout, Thief: The Dark Project, and GoldenEye 007 as game design influences, and used the stories and settings of Colossus: The Forbin Project, The Manchurian Candidate, RoboCop, The X-Files, and Men in Black as reference points. The team designed a skill system that featured "special powers" derived from nanotechnological augmentation and avoided the inclusion of die rolling and skills that required micromanagement. Spector also cited Konami's 1995 role-playing video game Suikoden as an inspiration, stating that the limited choices in Suikoden inspired him to expand on the idea with more meaningful choices in Deux Ex.

In early 1998, the Deus Ex team grew to 20 people, and the game entered a 28-month production phase. The development team consisted of three programmers, six designers, seven artists, a writer, an associate producer, a "tech", and Spector. Two writers and four testers were hired as contractors. Chris Norden was the lead programmer and assistant director, Harvey Smith the lead designer, Jay Lee the lead artist, and Sheldon Pacotti the lead writer. Close friends of the team who understood the intentions behind the game were invited to playtest and give feedback. The wide range of input led to debates in the office and changes to the game. Spector later concluded that the team was "blinded by promises of complete creative freedom", and by their belief that the game would have no budget, marketing, or time restraints. By mid-1998, the game's title had become Deus Ex, derived from the Latin literary device deus ex machina ("god from the machine"), in which a plot is resolved by an unpredictable intervention.

Spector felt that the best aspects of Deus Exs development were the "high-level vision" and length of preproduction, flexibility within the project, testable "proto-missions", and the Unreal Engine license. The team's pitfalls included the management structure, unrealistic goals, underestimating risks with artificial intelligence, their handling of proto-missions, and weakened morale from bad press.  Deus Ex was released on June 23, 2000, and published by Eidos Interactive for Microsoft Windows. The team planned third-party ports for Mac OS 9 and Linux.

Design 
The original 1997 design document for Deus Ex privileges character development over all other features. The game was designed to be "genre-busting": in parts simulation, role-playing, first-person shooter, and adventure. The team wanted players to consider "who they wanted to be" in the game, and for that to alter how they behaved in the game. In this way, the game world was "deeply simulated", or realistic and believable enough that the player would solve problems in creative, emergent ways without noticing distinct puzzles. However, the simulation ultimately failed to maintain the desired level of openness, and they had to brute force "skill", "action", and "character interaction" paths through each level. Playtesting also revealed that their idea of a role-playing game based on the real world was more interesting in theory than in reality, as certain aspects of the real world, such as hotels and office buildings, were not compelling in a game.

 The game's story changed considerably during production, but the idea of an augmented counterterrorist protagonist named JC Denton remained throughout. Though Spector originally pictured Deus Ex as akin to The X-Files, lead writer Sheldon Pacotti felt that it ended up more like James Bond. Spector wrote that the team overextended itself by planning highly elaborate scenes. Designer Harvey Smith removed a mostly complete White House level due to its complexity and production needs. Finished digital assets were repurposed or abandoned by the team. Pete Davison of USgamer referred to the White House and presidential bunker as "the truly deleted scenes of Deus Ex lost levels".

One of the things that Spector wanted to achieve in Deus Ex was to make JC Denton a cipher for the player, to create a better immersion and gameplay experience. He did not want the character to force any emotion, so that whatever feelings the player may be experiencing come from themselves rather than from JC Denton. To do this, Spector instructed voice actor Jay Anthony Franke to record his dialogue without any emotion but in a monotone voice, which is unusual for a voice acting role.

Once coded, the team's game systems did not work as intended. The early tests of the conversation system and user interface were flawed. The team also found augmentations and skills to be less interesting than they had seemed in the design document. In response, Harvey Smith substantially revised the augmentations and skills. Production milestones served as wake-up calls for the game's direction. A May 1998 milestone that called for a functional demo revealed that the size of the game's maps caused frame rate issues, which was one of the first signs that maps needed to be cut. A year later, the team reached a milestone for finished game systems, which led to better estimates for their future mission work and the reduction of the 500-page design document to 270 pages. Spector recalled Smith's mantra on this point: "less is more". 

One of the team's biggest blind spots was the AI programming for NPCs. Spector wrote that they considered it in preproduction, but that they did not figure out how to handle it until "relatively late in development". This led to wasted time when the team had to discard their old AI code. The team built atop their game engine's shooter-based AI instead of writing new code that would allow characters to exhibit convincing emotions. As a result, NPC behavior was variable until the very end of development. Spector felt that the team's "sin" was their inconsistent display of a trustable "human AI".

Technology 
 The game was developed on systems including dual-processor Pentium Pro 200s and Athlon 800s with eight and nine gigabyte hard drives, some using SCSI. The team used "more than 100 video cards" throughout development. Deus Ex was built using Visual Studio, Lightwave, and Lotus Notes. They also made a custom dialogue editor, ConEdit. The team used UnrealEd atop the Unreal game engine for map design, which Spector wrote was "superior to anything else available". Their trust in UnrealScript led them to code "special-cases" for their immediate mission needs instead of more generalized multi-case code. Even as concerned team members expressed misgivings, the team only addressed this later in the project. To Spector, this was a lesson to always prefer "general solutions" over "special casing", such that the toolset works predictably.

They waited to license a game engine until after preproduction, expecting the benefits of licensing to be more time for the content and gameplay, which Spector reported to be the case. They chose the Unreal engine, as it did 80% of what they needed from an engine and was more economical than building from scratch. Their small programming team allowed for a larger design group. The programmers also found the engine accommodating, though it took about nine months to acclimate to the software. Spector felt that they would have understood the code better had they built it themselves, instead of "treating the engine as a black box" and coding conservatively. He acknowledged that this precipitated into the Direct3D issues in their final release, which slipped through their quality assurance testing. Spector also noted that the artificial intelligence, pathfinding, and sound propagation were designed for shooters and should have been rewritten from scratch instead of relying on the engine. He thought the licensed engine worked well enough that he expected to use the same for the game's sequel Deus Ex: Invisible War and Thief 3. He added that developers should not attempt to force their technology to perform in ways it was not intended, and should find a balance between perfection and pragmatism.

Music 

The soundtrack of Deus Ex, composed by Alexander Brandon (primary contributor, including main theme), Dan Gardopée ("Naval Base" and "Vandenberg"), Michiel van den Bos ("UNATCO", "Lebedev's Airfield", "Airfield Action", "DuClare Chateau", plus minor contribution to some of Brandon's tracks), and Reeves Gabrels ("NYC Bar"), was praised by critics for complementing the gritty atmosphere predominant throughout the game with melodious and ambient music incorporated from a number of genres, including techno, jazz, and classical. The music sports a basic dynamic element, similar to the iMUSE system used in early 1990s LucasArts games; during play, the music will change to a different iteration of the currently playing song based on the player's actions, such as when the player starts a conversation, engages in combat, or transitions to the next level. All the music in the game is tracked - Gabrels' contribution, "NYC Bar", was converted to a module by Alexander Brandon.

Release 
Deus Ex has been re-released in several iterations since its original publication and has also been the basis of several mods developed by its fan community.

The Deus Ex: Game of the Year Edition, which was released on May 8, 2001, contains the latest game updates and a software development kit, a separate soundtrack CD, and a page from a fictional newspaper featured prominently in Deus Ex titled The Midnight Sun, which recounts recent events in the game's world. However, later releases of said version do not include the soundtrack CD and contain a PDF version of the newspaper on the game's disc.

The Mac OS version of the game, released a month after the Windows version, was shipped with the same capabilities and can also be patched to enable multiplayer support. However, publisher Aspyr Media did not release any subsequent editions of the game or any additional patches. As such, the game is only supported in Mac OS 9 and the "Classic" environment in Mac OS X, neither of which are compatible with Intel-based Macs. The Windows version will run on Intel-based Macs using Crossover, Boot Camp, or other software to enable a compatible version of Windows to run on a Mac.

A PlayStation 2 port of the game, retitled Deus Ex: The Conspiracy outside of Europe, was released on March 26, 2002. Along with motion-captured character animations and pre-rendered introductory and ending cinematics that replaced the original versions, it features a simplified interface with optional auto-aim. There are many minor changes in level design, some to balance gameplay, but most to accommodate loading transition areas, due to the memory limitations of the PlayStation 2. The PlayStation 2 version was re-released in Europe on the PlayStation 3 as a PlayStation 2 Classic on May 16, 2012.

Loki Games worked on a Linux version of the game, but the company went out of business before releasing it. The OpenGL layer they wrote for the port, however, was sent out to Windows gamers through an online patch.

Though their quality assurance did not see major Direct3D issues, players noted "dramatic slowdowns" immediately following the launch, and the team did not understand the "black box" of the Unreal engine well enough to make it do exactly what they needed. Spector characterized Deus Ex reviews into two categories based on how they begin with either how "Warren Spector makes games all by himself" or that "Deus Ex couldn't possibly have been made by Ion Storm". He has said that the game won over 30 "best of" awards in 2001, and concluded that their final game was not perfect, but that they were much closer for having tried to "do things right or not at all".

Mods 
Deus Ex was built on the Unreal Engine, which already had an active community of modders. In September 2000, Eidos Interactive and Ion Storm announced in a press release that they would be releasing the software development kit (SDK), which included all the tools used to create the original game. Several team members, as well as project director Warren Spector, stated that they were "really looking forward to seeing what [the community] does with our tools". The kit was released on September 22, 2000, and soon gathered community interest, followed by the release of tutorials, small mods, up to announcements of large mods and conversions. While Ion Storm did not hugely alter the engine's rendering and core functionality, they introduced role-playing elements.

In 2009, a fan-made mod called The Nameless Mod (TNM) was released by Off Topic Productions. The game's protagonist is a user of an Internet forum, with digital places represented as physical locations. The mod offers roughly the same amount of gameplay as Deus Ex and adds several new features to the game, with a more open world structure than Deus Ex and new weapons such as the player character's fists. The mod was developed over seven years and has thousands of lines of recorded dialogue and two different parallel story arcs. Upon its release, TNM earned a 9/10 overall from PC PowerPlay magazine. In Mod DB's 2009 Mod of the Year awards, The Nameless Mod won the Editor's Choice award for Best Singleplayer Mod.

In 2015, during the 15th anniversary of the game's release, Square Enix (who had acquired Eidos earlier) endorsed a free fan-created mod, Deus Ex: Revision, which was released through Steam. The mod, created by Caustic Creative, is a graphical overhaul of the original game, adding in support for newer versions of DirectX, upgraded textures adapted from previous mods, a remixed soundtrack, and more world-building aesthetics. It also alters aspects of gameplay, including new level design paths and in-game architecture. Another overhaul mod, GMDX, released its final version in mid-2017 with enhanced artificial intelligence, improved physics, and upgraded visual textures.

The Lay D Denton Project, a mod adding the ability to play as a female JC – a feature that had been planned for Deus Ex but ultimately not implemented – was released in 2021. This included the re-recording of all of JC's voice lines by voice actress Karen Rohan, the addition of 3D models for the character, and editing of all gendered references to JC including other characters' voice clips. The audio editing was the most difficult aspect, as any abnormalities would have been noticed easily; a few characters were too difficult to edit, and had to be recast for the mod.

Reception

Sales
According to Computer Gaming Worlds Stefan Janicki, Deus Ex had "sold well in North America" by early 2001. In the United States, it debuted at #6 on PC Data's sales chart for the week ending June 24, at an average retail price of $40. It fell to eighth place in its second week but rose again to position 6 in its third. It proceeded to place in the top 10 rankings for August 6–12 and the week ending September 2 and to secure 10th place overall for the months of July and August. Deus Ex achieved sales of 138,840 copies and revenues of $5 million in the United States by the end of 2000, according to PC Data. The firm tracked another 91,013 copies sold in the country during 2001.

The game was a larger hit in Europe; Janicki called it a "blockbuster" for the region, which broke a trend of weak sales for 3D games. He wrote, "[I]n Europe—particularly in England—the action/RPG dominated the charts all summer, despite competition from heavyweights like Diablo II and The Sims." In the German-speaking market, PC Player reported sales over 70,000 units for Deus Ex by early 2001. It debuted at #3 in the region for July 2000 and held the position in August, before dropping to #10, #12 and #27 over the following three months. In the United Kingdom, Deus Ex reached #1 on the sales charts during August and spent three months in the top 10. It received a "Silver" award from the Entertainment and Leisure Software Publishers Association (ELSPA) in February 2002, indicating lifetime sales of at least 100,000 units in the United Kingdom. The ELSPA later raised it to "Gold" status, for 200,000 sales.

In April 2009, Square-Enix revealed that Deus Ex had surpassed 1 million sales globally, but was outsold by Deus Ex: Invisible War.

Critical response 

Deus Ex received critical acclaim, attaining a score of 90 out of 100 from 28 critics on Metacritic. Thierry Nguyen from Computer Gaming World said that the game "delivers moments of brilliance, idiocy, ingenuity, and frustration". Computer Games Magazine praised the title for its deep gameplay and its use of multiple solutions to situations in the game. Similarly, Edge highlighted the game's freedom of choice, saying that Deus Ex "never tells you what to do. Goals are set, but alter according to your decisions." Eurogamers Rob Fahey lauded the game, writing, "Moody and atmospheric, compelling and addictive, this is first person gaming in grown-up form, and it truly is magnificent." Jeff Lundrigan reviewed the PC version of the game for Next Generation, rating it five stars out of five, and stated that "This is hands-down one of the best PC games ever made. Stop reading and go get yours now."

Former GameSpot reviewer Greg Kasavin, though awarding the game a score of 8.2 of 10, was disappointed by the security and lockpicking mechanics. "Such instances are essentially noninteractive", he wrote. "You simply stand there and spend a particular quantity of electronic picks or modules until the door opens or the security goes down." Kasavin made similar complaints about the hacking interface, noting that "Even with basic hacking skills, you'll still be able to bypass the encryption and password protection ... by pressing the 'hack' button and waiting a few seconds".

The game's graphics and voice acting were also met with muted enthusiasm. Kasavin complained of Deus Exs relatively sub-par graphics, blaming them on the game's "incessantly dark industrial environments". GamePro reviewer Chris Patterson took the time to note that despite being "solid acoustically", Deus Ex had moments of weakness. He poked fun at JC's "Joe Friday, 'just the facts', deadpan", and the "truly cheesy accents" of minor characters in Hong Kong and New York City. IGN called the graphics "blocky", adding that "the animation is stiff, and the dithering is just plain awful in some spots", referring to the limited capabilities of the Unreal Engine used to design the game. The website, later on, stated that "overall Deus Ex certainly looks better than your average game".

Reviewers and players also complained about the size of Deus Exs save files. An Adrenaline Vault reviewer noted that "Playing through the entire adventure, [he] accumulated over 250 MB of save game data, with the average file coming in at over 15 MB."

The game developed a strong cult following, leading to a core modding and playing community that remained active over 15 years after its release. In an interview with IGN in June 2015, game director Warren Spector said he never expected Deus Ex to sell many copies, but he did expect it to become a cult classic among a smaller, active community, and he continues to receive fan mail from players to date regarding their experiences and thoughts about Deus Ex.

Awards and accolades 
Deus Ex received over 30 "best of" awards in 2001, from outlets such as IGN, GameSpy, PC Gamer, Computer Gaming World, and The Adrenaline Vault. It won "Excellence in Game Design" and "Game Innovation Spotlight" at the 2001 Game Developers Choice Awards, and it was nominated for "Game of the Year". At the Interactive Achievement Awards, it won in the "Computer Innovation" and "Computer Action/Adventure" categories and received nominations for "Sound Design", "PC Role-Playing", and "Game of the Year" in both the PC and overall categories. The British Academy of Film and Television Arts named it "PC Game of the Year". The game also collected several "Best Story" accolades, including first prize in Gamasutra's 2006 "Quantum Leap" awards for storytelling in a video game.

Deus Ex has appeared in several lists of the greatest games. It was included in IGN "100 Greatest Games of All Time" (#40, #21 and #34 in 2003, 2005 and 2007, respectively), "Top 25 Modern PC Games" (4th place in 2010) and "Top 25 PC Games of All Time" (#20 and #21 in 2007 and 2009 respectively) lists. GameSpy featured the game in its "Top 50 Games of All Time" (18th place in 2001) and "25 Most Memorable Games of the Past 5 Years" (15th place in 2004) lists, and in the site's "Hall of Fame". PC Gamer placed Deus Ex on its "Top 100 PC Games of All Time" (#2, #2, #1 by staff and #4 by readers in 2007, 2008, 2010 and 2010 respectively) and "50 Best Games of All Time" (#10 and #27 in 2001 and 2005) lists, and it was awarded 1st place in PC Zones "101 Best PC Games Ever" feature. It was also included in Yahoo! UK Video Games' "100 Greatest Computer Games of All Time" (28th place) list, and in Edges "The 100 Best Videogames" (29th place in 2007) and "100 Best Games to Play Today" (57th place in 2009) lists. Deus Ex was named the second-best game of the 2000s by Gamasutra. In 2012, Time named it one of the 100 greatest video games of all time, and G4tv named it the 53rd best game of all time for its "complex and well-crafted story that was really the start of players making choices that genuinely affect the outcome". 1UP.com listed it as one of the most important games of all time, calling its influence "too massive to properly gauge". In 2019, the Guardian named it the 29th best game of the 21st century, describing it as a "cultural event".

Legacy

Sequels 
A sequel, Deus Ex: Invisible War, was released in the United States on December 2, 2003, and in Europe in early 2004 for Windows and Xbox. A second sequel, titled Deus Ex: Clan Wars, was initially conceived as a multiplayer-focused third game for the series. Deus Ex: Clan Wars was eventually published under the title Project: Snowblind.

On March 29, 2007, Valve announced Deus Ex and its sequel would be available for purchase from their Steam service. Among the games announced are several other Eidos franchise titles, including Thief: Deadly Shadows and Tomb Raider.

Eidos Montréal produced a prequel to Deus Ex called Deus Ex: Human Revolution. This was confirmed on November 26, 2007, when Eidos Montréal posted a teaser trailer for the title on their website. The game was released on August 23, 2011, for the PC, PlayStation 3, and Xbox 360 platforms and received critical acclaim.

On April 7, 2015, Eidos announced a sequel to Deus Ex: Human Revolution and second prequel to Deus Ex titled Deus Ex: Mankind Divided. It was released on August 23, 2016.

Adaptation 
A film adaptation based on the game was initially announced in May 2002 by Columbia Pictures. The film was being produced by Laura Ziskin, along with Greg Pruss attached with writing the screenplay. Peter Schlessel, president of the production for Columbia Pictures, and Paul Baldwin, president of marketing for Eidos Interactive, stated that they were confident in that the adaptation would be a successful development for both the studios and the franchise. In March 2003, during an interview with Greg Pruss, he informed IGN that the character of JC Denton would be "a little bit filthier than he was in the game". He further stated that the script was shaping up to be darker in tone than the original game. Although a release date was scheduled for 2006, the film did not get past the scripting stage.

In 2012, CBS films revived the project, buying the rights and commissioning a film inspired by the Deux Ex series; its direct inspiration was the 2011 game Human Revolution. C. Robert Cargill and Scott Derrickson were to write the screenplay, and Derrickson was to direct the film.

References

Notes

Footnotes 

 Sources

External links 

 Official page on Eidos site

2000 video games
Fiction set in 2052
Action role-playing video games
Cancelled Linux games
Cyberpunk video games
Cyberpunk
Postcyberpunk
Nanopunk
Deus Ex
Dystopian video games
Eidos Interactive games
Existentialist video games
First-person shooters
Interactive Achievement Award winners
Ion Storm games
Classic Mac OS games
Multiplayer and single-player video games
Multiplayer online games
PlayStation 2 games
Stealth video games
Works about globalism
Unreal Engine games
Video games scored by Alexander Brandon
Video games scored by Dan Gardopée
Video games scored by Michiel van den Bos
Video games developed in the United States
Video games about viral outbreaks
Video games set in the United States
Video games set in California
Video games set in China
Video games set in Hong Kong
Video games set in Nevada
Video games set in New York City
Video games set in France
Video games set in Paris
Video games set in the 2050s
Video games with alternate endings
Windows games
Works about conspiracy theories
Immersive sims
BAFTA Interactive Entertainment Award for Best Games winners
Works about the Illuminati
Triad (organized crime)
Game Developers Choice Award winners
Video games designed by Harvey Smith
Video games produced by Warren Spector
Video games directed by Warren Spector
D.I.C.E. Award for Action Game of the Year winners
D.I.C.E. Award for Adventure Game of the Year winners
Aspyr games